Cyzicus (Kúzikos; , Aydıncıḳ) was an ancient Greek town in Mysia in Anatolia in the current Balıkesir Province of Turkey. It was located on the shoreward side of the present Kapıdağ Peninsula (the classical Arctonnesus), a tombolo which is said to have originally been an island in the Sea of Marmara only to be connected to the mainland in historic times either by artificial means or an earthquake.

The site of Cyzicus, located on the Erdek and Bandırma roads, is protected by Turkey's Ministry of Culture.

History

Ancient
The city was said to have been founded by Pelasgians from Thessaly, according to tradition at the coming of the Argonauts; later it received many colonies from Miletus, allegedly in 756 BC, but its importance began near the end of the Peloponnesian War when the conflict centered on the sea routes connecting Greece to the Black Sea. At this time, the cities of Athens and Miletus diminished in importance while Cyzicus began to prosper. Commander of the Athenian fleet Alcibiades defeated the Spartan fleet in a major naval engagement near Cyzicus known as the Battle of Cyzicus in 410 BC. Famed ancient philosopher Eudoxus of Cnidus established  a school at Cyzicus and went with his pupils to Athens, visiting Plato. Later he returned to Cyzicus and died in 355 B.C. The era of Olympiads in Cyzicus was reckoned from 135 or 139.

Owing to its advantageous position it speedily acquired commercial importance, and the gold staters of Cyzicus were a staple currency in the ancient world till they were superseded by those of Philip of Macedon. Its unique and characteristic coin, the cyzicenus, was worth 28 drachmae.

 
During the Peloponnesian War (431–404 BC) Cyzicus was subject to the Athenians and Lacedaemonians alternately. In the naval Battle of Cyzicus in 410 during the Peloponnesian War, an Athenian fleet  routed and completely destroyed a Spartan fleet. At the peace of Antalcidas (387 BC), like the other Greek cities in Asia, it was made over to Persia. Alexander the Great later captured it from the Persians in 334 BC and was later claimed to be responsible for connecting the island to the mainland.

The history of the town in Hellenistic times is closely connected with that of the Attalids of Pergamon, with whose extinction it came into direct relations with Rome. Cyzicus was held for the Romans against King Mithridates VI of Pontus who besieged it with 300,000 men in 74 BC, but it withstood him stoutly, and the siege was raised by Lucullus: the loyalty of the city was rewarded by an extension of territory and other privileges. The Romans favored it and recognized its municipal independence. Cyzicus was the leading city of Northern Mysia as far as Troas. 

Under Tiberius, it was incorporated into the Roman Empire but remained the capital of Mysia (afterwards, Hellespontus) and became one of the great cities of the ancient world.

There was a women's cult at Cyzicus worshiping the goddess Artemis, which was called Dolon (Δόλων).

Medieval
Cyzicus was captured temporarily by the Arabs led by Muawiyah I in AD 675. It appears to have been ruined by a series of earthquakes beginning in 443, with the last in 1063. Although its population was transferred to Artake before the 13th century when the peninsula was occupied by the Crusaders, in 1324 the metropolitan of Cyzicus was one of three sees in Anatolia which was able to contribute a temporary annual subsidy to the Patriarchate of Constantinople. Following its conquest by the Ottomans it underwent hard times. From a point between 1370 and 1372 until 1387, the metropolitan was empty; Speros Vryonis speculates this was due to financial difficulties. Later in the 14th century, the sees of Chalcedon and certain patriarchal possessions in Bithynia and Hellespont were bestowed on the metropolitan of Cyzicus.

In the Ottoman era, it was part of the kaza of Erdek in the province of Brusa.

Ecclesiastical history 
Cyzicus, as capital of the Roman province of Hellespontus, was its ecclesiastical metropolitan see. In the Notitiae Episcopatuum of Pseudo-Epiphanius, composed in about 640, Cyzicus had 12 suffragan sees; Abydus, Baris in Hellesponto (between Sariköy and Biga), Dardanus, Germa in Hellesponto (ruins of Germaslu, Kirmasti, Girmas), Hadrianotherae (Uzuncia yayla), Ilium, Lampsacus, Miletopolis, Oca, Pionia (Avcılar), Poemanenum (Eskimanias), Troas. The province also included two autocephalous archiepiscopal sees: Parium and Proconnesus.

Residential bishops 
Cyzicus had a catalogue of bishops beginning with the 1st century; Michel Le Quien mentions fifty-nine. A more complete list is found in Nicodemos, in the Greek "Office of St. Emilian" (Constantinople, 1876), 34–36, which has eighty-five names. Of particular importance are the famous Arian theologian Eunomius of Cyzicus; Saint Dalmatius; bishops Proclus and Germanus, who became Patriarchs of Constantinople; and Saint Emilian, a martyr in the 8th century. Another saint who came from Cyzicus, Saint Tryphaena of Cyzicus, is the patron saint of the city. Gelasius, a historian of Arianism, who wrote about 475, was born at Cyzicus.

 George Kleidas, Metropolitan of Cyzicus in ca. 1253–61
 Theodore Skoutariotes, Metropolitan of Cyzicus in ca. 1277
 Daniel Glykys, Metropolitan of Cyzicus in 1285–89
 Methodius, Metropolitan of Cyzicus from 1289
 Niphon I, Patriarch of Constantinople in 1310–14, was Metropolitan of Cyzicus in 1303–10
 Athanasios, Metropolitan of Cyzicus in 1324–47
 Theodoretos, proedros of Cyzicus in 1370–72
 Sebasteianos, Metropolitan of Cyzicus in 1381–86
 Matthew I, Patriarch of Constantinople in 1397–1410, was Metropolitan of Cyzicus in 1387–97
 Theognostos, Metropolitan of Cyzicus in 1399–1405
 Makarios, Metropolitan of Cyzicus in 1409
 Metrophanes II, Patriarch of Constantinople in 1440–43, was Metropolitan of Cyzicus in 1436–40
 Cyril IV, Patriarch of Constantinople in 1711–13, was Metropolitan of Cyzicus before that

Cyzicus remained a metropolitan see of the Greek Orthodox Church until the 1923 Convention Concerning the Exchange of Greek and Turkish Populations emptied it of Greek Orthodox faithful, whether they spoke Greek or Turkish. The last bishop of the see died in 1932. Today it is a titular metropolis of the Ecumenical Patriarchate of Constantinople.

Catholic titular see 
Since 1885, the Catholic Church lists Cyzicus as a titular see. of the highest (Metropolitan) rank, but vacant since 1974. Titular metropolitans were:

 John Baptist Lamy (1885.08.18 – 1888.02.13)
 William Benedict Scarisbrick, O.S.B. (1888.09.08 – 1908.05.07)
 José María Cázares y Martínez (1908.04.29 – 1909.03.31)
 Johannes Fidelis Battaglia (1909.07.03 – 1913.09.10)
 Simeón Pereira y Castellón (1913.12.02 – 1921.01.29)
 Giacomo Sereggi (1921.10.14 – 1922.04.11)
 Giuseppe Moràbito (1922.07.04 – 1923.12.03)
 Antal Papp (1924.07.14 – 1945.12.24)
 Manuel Marilla Ferreira da Silva (1949.05.29 – 1974.11.23)

Monuments
The site amid the marshes of Balkiz Serai is known as Bal-Kiz and entirely uninhabited, though under cultivation. The principal extant ruins are the walls, dating from the fourth century, which are traceable for nearly their whole extent, and the substructures of the temple of Hadrian, the ruins of a Roman aqueduct and a theatre.

The picturesque amphitheatre, intersected by a stream, was one of the largest in the world. Construction for the amphitheatre began in the middle of the first century until the end of the third. Of this magnificent building, sometimes ranked among the seven wonders of the ancient world, thirty-one immense columns still stood erect in 1444. These have since been carried away piecemeal for building purposes.

Colossal foundations of a temple dedicated to the Emperor Hadrian are still visible: the columns were 21.35 metres high (about 70 feet), while the highest known elsewhere, those at Baalbek in Lebanon are only 19.35 metres (about 63 feet).

The monuments of Cyzicus were used by the Byzantine emperor Justinian as a quarry for the building of his Saint Sophia cathedral, and were still exploited by the Ottomans.

Notable people
Androsthenes of Cyzicus, 200 BC, accompanied King Antiochus III the Great to India.
Eudoxus of Cyzicus, 130 BC, navigator and explorer.
Proclus of Constantinople, appointed metropolitan of Cyzicus in 5th century but never functioned as such; patriarch of Constantinople and important figure in the development of Christology
Germanus of Constantinople, early eighth century metropolitan of Cyzicus and later Patriarch of Constantinople and early iconophile theologian
Gelasius of Cyzicus, 5th century ecclesiastical writer.
Adrastus of Cyzicus, a mathematician cited by Augustine of Hippo
Theophanes the Confessor, who began his formal religious life at the Polychronius Monastery, located near Cyzicus.
Iaia, a female painter, sculptor, and ivory engraver, known as Iaia of Cyzicus.
Neanthes of Cyzicus, rhetor

See also 

 Ancient sites of Balıkesir

References

Sources

External links

Ancient Greek coins of Kyzikos

Milesian colonies
Greek colonies in Mysia
Ancient Greek archaeological sites in Turkey
Roman towns and cities in Turkey
Former populated places in Turkey
Geography of Balıkesir Province
History of Balıkesir Province
Tourist attractions in Balıkesir Province
Buildings and structures in Balıkesir Province
Members of the Delian League
Roman fortifications in Roman Asia
Defunct dioceses of the Ecumenical Patriarchate of Constantinople